Ottmarsfelder Graben is a river of Bavaria, Germany. The river is a three kilometer long brook in the Middle Franconian district of Weißenburg-Gunzenhausen. It flows to the west, and joins the Swabian Rezat at Zollmühle, north of Ellingen. Its upper section, upstream from Ottmarsfeld, is also referred to as the Seiserbach.

See also
List of rivers of Bavaria

References

Rivers of Bavaria
Weißenburg-Gunzenhausen
Rivers of Germany